The black-headed saltator (Saltator atriceps) is a seed-eating bird in the tanager family Thraupidae. It breeds from central Mexico to eastern Panama.

The adult has a slate-grey head with a whitish supercilium. The upperparts are yellowish green, the underparts are pale grey, and the throat is white edged with black. The thick convex bill is black and the legs are brown. Young birds are duller and have mottling on the breast and brown markings on the underparts. This species is similar to the buff-throated saltator but is larger and has a darker head and paler under parts with a yellow patch on the throat. 

The common call is a raucous . The song is a loud scratchy cher cher jur jur weeee, often given by males as a duet.

The black-headed saltator is a species of dense vegetation. The black-headed saltator feeds on fruit, buds, nectar, and slow-moving insects. It forages at low and mid-levels, sometimes with mixed species flocks.

Footnotes

References

 
 PDF fulltext

External links

 
 
 
 
 
 
 
 

black-headed saltator
Birds of Central America
Birds of Mexico
Birds of the Sierra Madre del Sur
Birds of the Yucatán Peninsula
black-headed saltator
Taxa named by René Lesson